Carnival Arcane is the 14th album by dark ambient band Midnight Syndicate, released in 2011. Featuring the blend of dark, orchestral, instrumental music and horror-inspired soundscape the band had become known for, the "dark carnival" theme of the album centers on a fictional, early-20th century traveling circus called The Lancaster Rigby Carnival.

Background and album information 
Carnival Arcane was inspired by research into carnivals of the early 20th century and Ray Bradbury's Something Wicked This Way Comes. In a 2011 interview with FEARnet, composer, Edward Douglas said:  We've definitely put together something different for us (Midnight Syndicate), but we still maintain our identity. More than ever, we really focused on using sound effects and design to pull you into the world of the disc. The music is still the focus, absolutely, but there are many times that it feels like an 'imaginary film' more than anything we've done to this point." The album featured voice acting performances by actors, Jason Carter, Dennis Carter, Jr., and Brian Van Camp, all who had appeared in the band's previous project, The Dead Matter (2010) horror film.

Reception 
Fangoria, Dread Central, FEARnet, and Outburn Magazine all praised the band's execution of their "cinema of the mind" concept through the use of instrumental music and sound design.<ref>[https://web.archive.org/web/20120607084123/http://www.dreadcentral.com/reviews/midnight-syndicate-carnival-arcane CD Review: Carnival Arcane] Mr. Dark, June 4, 2012</ref>George Pacheco, "Music Review: Carnival Arcane", Outburn, (Thousand Oaks, CA), Issue 61, Pg. 68 Mike Beardsall of Rue Morgue complimented the album's "immersive" qualities, adding that "coulrophobics, however, should probably skip this ride." In 2012, the album won the Best Horror CD category in the 10th annual Rondo Hatton Classic Horror Awards. The album was also nominated for Best RPG Related Product in the 2012 ENnie Awards in the role-playing game industry

 Track listing 

 Personnel 
Edward Douglas – composer
Gavin Goszka – composer
Jason Carter - voice actor - Ringmaster, Montgomery LancasterDennis Carter, Jr. - voice actor - Laughing DennyAmber Foth - vocals on Kiddieland''
Brian Van Camp - voice actor
Todd Malkus - voice actor
Keith Martin - voice actor
Mary Kate Douglas - voice actor
Sarah Douglas - voice actor

Production 
Producers – Edward Douglas, Gavin Goszka
Mastering – Gavin Goszka
Cover art and Design - Brainstorm Design Group
Band Photography - Anthony Gray
Additional Photography - Wisconsin Historical Society, Darkride and Funhouse Enthusiasts (DAFE)

References

External links
Midnight Syndicate band website

2011 albums
Midnight Syndicate albums